In oceanography, the Davidson Current is a coastal countercurrent of the Pacific Ocean running north along the western coast of the United States from Baja California, Mexico to northern Oregon, ending at about latitude 48°N,
Its flow is adjacent to the California Current, but it flows north rather than south and hugs the coastline. In these months, northerly winds weaken and are replaced to some extent by southwesterly winds.

The Davidson Current was discovered by the American geodesist, astronomer, geographer, surveyor and engineer George Davidson, who was associated with the early California Academy of Sciences (CAS) in San Francisco, California.

References

See also
North Pacific Gyre

Climate of California
Currents of the Pacific Ocean